Bockenau is an Ortsgemeinde – a municipality belonging to a Verbandsgemeinde, a kind of collective municipality – in the Bad Kreuznach district in Rhineland-Palatinate, Germany. It belongs to the Verbandsgemeinde of Rüdesheim, whose seat is in the municipality of Rüdesheim an der Nahe. Bockenau is a state-recognized tourism centre.

Geography

Location
Bockenau lies at the south edge of the Hunsrück in the Ellerbach valley at the 380 m-high Wingertsberg and is enclosed by the Soonwald foothills, whose highest elevation is the Ellerspring at 657 m above sea level, which is also where the Ellerbach, which passes through Bockenau, rises. The village thus lies geographically in the scenically interesting and to a great extent untouched Gauchswald (forest). As a whole, the countryside is known as the Bockenauer Schweiz ("Bockenau Switzerland"), as reflected in the name borne by the village's sport and event centre. The municipal area measures 9.66 km².

Neighbouring municipalities
Clockwise from the north, Bockenau's neighbours are the municipality of Allenfeld, the municipality of Sponheim, the municipality of Burgsponheim, the municipality of Waldböckelheim, the municipality of Nußbaum, the municipality of Daubach, the municipality of Rehbach and the municipality of Winterburg.

Constituent communities
Also belonging to Bockenau is the outlying homestead of Lindenhof.

History
Beginning no later than the 12th century, Bockenau belonged to the County of Sponheim and was thereby one of its oldest landholds, and therefore lies today on the Sponheimer Weg, an historically thematized hiking trail. Nevertheless, the village's origins actually go much further back. When the new building zone "In der Bein" was opened, foundations of a Roman villa rustica from the 3rd century AD were found. This was proved by the coins that were also unearthed. On the lands of the campground called Bockenauer Schweiz, lying within municipal limits, and the settlement of Daubacher Brücke (between Winterburg and Bockenau) once lay, in the Middle Ages, Nunkirchen, a homestead with a church that was owned by Jutta von Sponheim.

Population development
Bockenau's population development since Napoleonic times is shown in the table below. The figures for the years from 1871 to 1987 are drawn from census data.

Religion
As at 31 August 2013, there are 1,241 full-time residents in Bockenau, and of those, 536 are Evangelical (43.191%), 477 are Catholic (38.437%), 2 are Greek Orthodox (0.161%), 32 (2.579%) belong to other religious groups and 194 (15.633%) either have no religion or will not reveal their religious affiliation.

Politics

Municipal council
The council is made up of 16 council members, who were elected by majority vote at the municipal election held on 7 June 2009, and the honorary mayor as chairman.

Mayor
Bockenau's mayor is Jürgen Klotz, and his deputies are Rolf Stangenberg and Manfred Hay.

Culture and sightseeing

Buildings
The following are listed buildings or sites in Rhineland-Palatinate's Directory of Cultural Monuments:
 Evangelical parish church, Winterburger Straße 21 – Baroque aisleless church, marked 1748; west tower, District Master Builder Ludwig Behr
 Saint Lawrence's Catholic Church (Kirche St. Laurentius), Waldböckelheimer Straße 9 – Romanesquified aisleless church, 1905; at the church sandstone Crucifix, marked 1892
 Lindenstraße 2 – Baroque timber-frame house, partly solid, 18th century
 Mainzer Straße – former bakehouse; Classicized rusticated building, 1923
 Waldböckelheimer Straße, at the graveyard – arcade hall with soldier figure, 1923
 At Winterburger Straße 3 – spolia, former keystone, 18th century
 Winterburger Straße 12 – so-called Haus Hay; timber-frame house, partly solid, partly slated, about 1900
 Winterburger Straße 15 – town hall; Historicized plastered building with former fire equipment room, marked 1846
 Winterburger Straße 21 – Evangelical rectory, Late Baroque building with half-hip roof, marked 1766
 Winterburger Straße 23 – Baroque timber-frame house, partly solid, 18th century
 Near Winterburger Straße 25 – Late Gründerzeit sandstone Crucifix, marked 1903
 Winterburger Straße 34/36 – villalike Late Classicist house (former Catholic school), about 1880
 Winterburger Straße 38/40 – former Evangelical school; Late Classicist plastered building, about 1830/1840
 Signpost, on Landesstraße 237 – Classicist sandstone obelisk, about 1820
 Signpost, at Landesstraße 238/Kreisstraße 23 – Classicist sandstone obelisk, about 1820

Clubs
Bockenau has an active club life manifested mainly at the new Bockenauer Schweiz Halle.

Museums
On the way out of the village to the south is found an open-air Kleinbahn museum. Visitors can discover – and even climb – two Krauss-Maffei narrow-gauge steam locomotives, one of them of the type ÖBB 998, together with a restored coach and a typical guard's hut with a great signal tree from the same time period. The Kreuznacher Kleinbahn ran from 1896 to 1936 between Winterburg and Bad Kreuznach.

Economy and infrastructure

Winegrowing
Known countrywide is the 12.5 ha Schäfer-Fröhlich winery, which belongs to the Verband Deutscher Prädikatsweingüter (VDP).

Established businesses
The firm HAY's drop forge is with its newly expanded plant the biggest employer in the village and ensures together with its other location in nearby Bad Sobernheim more than 1,200 skilled jobs in the emergent region.

Education
Bockenau has one primary school.

Transport
Running to Bockenau's south is Bundesstraße 41, which since 2008 has been a four-lane highway. Serving the neighbouring town of Bad Sobernheim is a railway station on the Nahe Valley Railway (Bingen–Saarbrücken) with direct service without transfer to Frankfurt am Main by Regional-Express train. Five kilometres to the northwest lies the disused Pferdsfeld military airfield, while 35 km farther on in that same direction is found Frankfurt-Hahn Airport.

Famous people

Sons and daughters of the town
 Johann Friedrich Abegg (22 May 1761 – 8 August 1840 in Bremen), salesman and senator in Bremen
 Rudolf Desch (1 August 1911 – 15 February 1997 in Bad Sobernheim), composer and professor

References

External links

Bad Kreuznach (district)
Districts of the Rhine Province